The 2017 City of London Corporation election took place on 23 March 2017 to elect members of the Court of Common Council in the City of London Corporation. The election was the first time apart from a 2014 by-election that partisan candidates were elected to the body. Fifteen of the hundred seats on the council were won by political parties: the newly created Temple & Farringdon Together party and the Labour Party.

The elections attracted media attention as they represented a high point in the City of London for Labour, who until the 2017 election had only ever won a single seat in a 2014 by-election for Portsoken ward.

26 councillors were elected unopposed: twenty-five independents and one Labour.

Background 
Elections to the Court of Common Council, the main decision-making body of the City of London Corporation which governs the City of London, take place every four years. In the previous election in 2013, all 100 seats were won by independent candidates.

In a 2014 by-election for the Portsoken ward, the Labour Party won its first seat on the council with the Anglican priest William Campbell-Taylor becoming the first partisan councillor to be elected to the body.

Electoral system 
Most residents of the twenty-five wards of the City of London live in the Aldersgate, Cripplegate, Portsoken and Queenhithe. Residents have one vote each, and businesses have a number of votes that scales with the number of employees. Businesses can appoint one employee as a voter for every five staff up to ten voters, with an additional voter per fifty staff beyond that.

Councillors are elected by multi-member first-past-the-post.

Overall result

Ward results 

Incumbent councillors are marked with an asterisk (*).

Aldersgate

Aldgate

Bassishaw

Billingsgate

Bishopsgate

Bread Street

Bridge and Bridge Without

Broad Street

Candlewick

Castle Baynard

Cheap

Coleman Street

Cordwainer

Cornhill

Cripplegate

Dowgate

Farringdon Within

Farringdon Without

Langbourn

Lime Street

Portsoken

Queenhithe

Tower

Vintry

Walbrook

Changes since the election

By-elections

March 2018
A by-election was held in Bishopsgate ward on 20 March 2018, following the election of independent Common Councilman Prem Goyal as Alderman for Portsoken ward in December 2017. The seat was won by independent Shravan Joshi.

A by-election was held in Billingsgate ward on 22 March 2018, following the resignation of independent Common Councilman Michael Welbank. The seat was won by independent John Allen-Petrie.

October 2018
A by-election was held in Castle Baynard ward on 9 October 2018, following the election of independent Common Councilman Emma Edham as Alderman for Candlewick ward in July 2017. The seat was won by Labour candidate Natasha Lloyd-Owen.

References

2017
2017 English local elections